The 2017 Scottish Open Grand Prix was a badminton tournament which took place at Emirates Arena in Glasgow in the Scotland from 22 to 26 November 2017 and had a total purse of $65,000.

Tournament
The 2017 Scottish Open Grand Prix was the seventeenth Grand Prix's badminton tournament of the 2017 BWF Grand Prix Gold and Grand Prix and also part of the Scottish Open championships. This tournament organized by the Badminton Scotland, with sanction from the BWF.

Venue
This international tournament was held at Emirates Arena in Glasgow, Scotland.

Point distribution
Below is the table with the point distribution for each phase of the tournament based on the BWF points system for the Grand Prix event.

Prize money
The total prize money for this year tournament is US$65,000. Distribution of prize money will be in accordance with BWF regulations.

Men's singles

Seeds

 Rajiv Ouseph (withdrew)
 Ygor Coelho (quarterfinals)
 Emil Holst (quarterfinals)
 Pablo Abián (first round)
 Fabian Roth (withdrew)
 Mark Caljouw (semifinals)
 Vladimir Malkov (first round)
 Kim Bruun (withdrew)
 Raul Must (third round)
 Rasmus Gemke (semifinals)
 Kieran Merrilees (first round)
 Subhankar Dey (third round)
 Toby Penty (champion)
 Eetu Heino (second round)
 Kalle Koljonen (third round)
 Lucas Corvée (final)

Finals

Top half

Section 1

Section 2

Section 3

Section 4

Bottom half

Section 5

Section 6

Section 7

Section 8

Women's singles

Seeds

 Kirsty Gilmour (champion)
 Beatriz Corrales (semifinals)
 Mia Blichfeldt (final)
 Linda Zetchiri (quarterfinals)
 Natalia Koch Rohde (quarterfinals)
 Rachel Honderich (second round)
 Sofie Holmboe Dahl (second round)
 Natalia Perminova (quarterfinals)

Finals

Top half

Section 1

Section 2

Bottom half

Section 3

Section 4

Men's doubles

Seeds

 Marcus Ellis / Chris Langridge (second round)
 Jones Ralfy Jansen / Josche Zurwonne (quarterfinals)
 Peter Briggs / Tom Wolfenden (second round)
 Frederik Colberg / Rasmus Fladberg (quarterfinals)
 Jason Anthony Ho-Shue / Nyl Yakura (quarterfinals)
 Konstantin Abramov / Alexandr Zinchenko (second round)
 Jelle Maas / Robin Tabeling (champions)
 Jacco Arends / Ruben Jille (final)

Finals

Top half

Section 1

Section 2

Bottom half

Section 3

Section 4

Women's doubles

Seeds

 Anastasia Chervyakova / Olga Morozova (semifinals)
 Emilie Lefel / Anne Tran (quarterfinals)
 Chloe Birch / Jessica Pugh (quarterfinals)
 Jenny Moore / Victoria Williams (second round)

Finals

Top half

Section 1

Section 2

Bottom half

Section 3

Section 4

Mixed doubles

Seeds

 Sam Magee / Chloe Magee (quarterfinals)
 Ronan Labar / Audrey Fontaine (withdrew)
 Ben Lane / Jessica Pugh (second round)
 Mikkel Mikkelsen / Mai Surrow (final)
 Marcus Ellis / Lauren Smith (withdrew)
 Jacco Arends / Selena Piek (champions)
 Robin Tabeling / Cheryl Seinen (semifinals)
 Bastian Kersaudy / Lea Palermo (quarterfinals)

Finals

Top half

Section 1

Section 2

Bottom half

Section 3

Section 4

References

External links
 Official site
 Tournament Link

Scottish Open (badminton)
BWF Grand Prix Gold and Grand Prix
Open Grand Prix
International sports competitions in Glasgow
Scottish Open Grand Prix
Scottish Open Grand Prix